Stereolife is an English language hit in Norway for the Norwegian band Donkeyboy, their sixth single taken from their album Caught in a Life after singles "Ambitions" and "Sometimes" (both #1s for 13 and 8 weeks consecutively in the Norwegian Singles Chart), "Broke My Eyes" (that reached #6), "Awake" (that reached #8) and "Blade Running" (that reached #8).

"Stereolife" released in 2010 but not yet charted in the Norwegian Singles Chart.

References

2010 singles
Donkeyboy songs
2009 songs
Warner Music Group singles
Songs written by Simen Eriksrud
Songs written by Cato Sundberg